Robert Petkoff is an American stage actor known for his work in Shakespearean productions and more recently on the New York City musical theater stage. Petkoff has performed on Broadway, the West End, regional theatre, and done work in film and television. Petkoff was featured as "Perchik" in the Tony award-nominated 2004 revival cast of Fiddler on the Roof but is perhaps best known for his role as "Tateh" in the 2009 revival of Ragtime on Broadway. Petkoff has also provided the voices for over two dozen audiobooks, winning awards for his reading of Michael Koryta's So Cold the River. Married to actress Susan Wands, Petkoff has lived in New York City for the last twenty years, and often performs in benefit concerts for theater-district-related charities.

Early life and career
Robert Petkoff is the son of Carolyn and Peter Petkoff, the fifth of seven children, and was born in Sacramento, California. His father was an officer in the Air Force and Robert grew up living all over the United States. He graduated from Princeton High School (Illinois) and attended Illinois State University, studying theater. After finishing college, he began acting with the Illinois Shakespeare Festival, then continued his career in Chicago, working with the Oak Park Festival Theatre and Chicago Shakespeare Theater.

While in Chicago Robert was cast in the TV pilot "Mona", a spin-off from Who's The Boss?. He moved to Los Angeles and lived there for five years, where along with television work, he also worked in local theaters.

Petkoff performed in Los Angeles-area stage productions including Julius Caesar at the Mark Taper Forum directed by a young Oskar Eustis, and The School for Husbands at the Old Globe Theatre in San Diego, California. In 1993, Petkoff was cast by Michael Kahn as the Duke of Aumerle in Kahn's production of Richard II at the Shakespeare Theatre Company in Washington, D.C., performing twice more for the company in 1994.

After returning to Chicago to perform under Barbara Gaines at the Chicago Shakespeare Theater as Troilus in Troilus and Cressida and as Hamlet in Hamlet, Petkoff worked with director Mark Lamos, who cast him as Romeo in Romeo and Juliet at the Hartford Stage Company, with Calista Flockhart as Juliet.

Stage career

Petkoff first appeared on Broadway in Epic Proportions starring Kristin Chenoweth, and shortly after he was cast in Sir Peter Hall's production of Tantalus, which was a co-production of The Denver Center for The Performing Arts and the Royal Shakespeare Company. The production opened in Denver and then toured in the UK, with a final performance at the Barbican Theatre in London. The production of Tantalus was the subject of a TV documentary, which examined the turbulent collaboration with John Barton and Sir Peter Hall.

Petkoff would go on to work with Sir Peter Hall in two other productions: as Perry Stewart in The Royal Family (play) with Judi Dench, Toby Stevens and Emily Blunt in London's Theater Royal Haymarket, and as Algernon in The Importance of Being Earnest with Lynn Redgrave in a national tour.

Petkoff's first professional musical role was with the Chicago Shakespeare Theater, when he starred as George in Sunday in the Park with George, directed by Gary Griffin in 2002. Although not trained as a musical theater singer, he had been trained as a stage actor at Illinois State University, this was the first of his musical theater roles. Petkoff's first Broadway musical was as Perchik in the Broadway revival of Fiddler on the Roof starring Alfred Molina and Harvey Fierstein. 
 
Petkoff was cast as Sir Robin in the National Tour of Spamalot in 2007 replacing David Turner in the role. After a year on tour, he was invited to join the Broadway company and in 2008 replaced Martin Moran in the role until Clay Aiken took over. Petkoff reclaimed the role again after Clay's first departure.

Petkoff returned to Broadway in Ragtime, as Tateh, in the 2009 revival directed by Marcia Milgrom Dodge, which opened at the Neil Simon Theater in November 2009 and closed January 10, 2010. The revival was nominated for seven 2010 Tony Awards, including Best Musical Revival; and was also nominated for nine 2010 Drama Desk Awards, including Outstanding Revival of a Musical.

Pekoff performed the role of Buddy in Follies, with the Chicago Shakespeare Festival, directed by Gary Griffin in October 2011.

In 2012, Petkoff starred in the Roundabout Theatre production of Anything Goes, as Lord Evelyn Oakleigh, love interest for Reno Sweeney, played by Stephanie J. Block, at the Stephen Sondheim Theatre.

In 2014, he starred on Broadway as Hubert Humphrey in All the Way opposite Bryan Cranston as LBJ.

In 2015, Robert appeared as Richard Hanny in 39 Steps at the Union Square Theater in New York City. He then went on to play the title role in Sweeney Todd at the Denver Center for the Performing Arts.

At the end of 2016 and throughout 2017, Robert played the role of Bruce Bechdel in the first national tour of the Tony award-winning musical Fun Home.

Musical theater

Petkoff's first musical was with the Chicago Shakespeare Theater, when he starred as George in Sunday in the Park with George, directed by Gary Griffin in 2002.

Petkoff's first appearance on Broadway in a musical was as Perchik in the 2004 production of Fiddler on the Roof, starring Alfred Molina. Directed by David Leveaux, the revival was nominated for the 2004 Tony Award for Best Revival of a Musical and the Drama Desk Award for Outstanding Revival of a Musical.

In 2007, he joined the national tour of Spamalot as Sir Robin for a year, and then played the role on Broadway, replacing Martin Moran in the role before Clay Aiken took over and then returned when Clay departed.

In 2009, Petkoff appeared in Happiness at Lincoln Center Theater, directed by Susan Stroman, playing the part of Neil.

Petkoff has also worked with several musical theater workshops, including a reading of new musical version of Enchanted April in the role of Mr. Briggs in March 2010.

Petkoff also appeared as Guy Fawkes in the New York Stage & Film's Powerhouse Theater production of Bonfire Night, directed by Alex Timbers.

Petkoff appeared in the Like Water for Chocolate musical workshop with Tony Award winner Chita Rivera at the Sundance Institute's 2011 Theatre Lab in Alberta, Canada, in April 2011. In addition to Chita Rivera (Kiss of the Spider Woman, Chicago, The Rink), and Robert Petkoff (Ragtime, Spamalot, Fiddler on the Roof), the cast included Nicholas Rodriguez (Tarzan, One Life to Live).

Selected works

Recordings

Theater

Filmography

Film and television

References

External links
 Robert Petkoff official website
 
 

Year of birth missing (living people)
Living people
American male stage actors
Male actors from Sacramento, California